Sanjak of Syrmia was an administrative territorial entity of the Ottoman Empire formed in 1541. It was located in the Syrmia region and was part of the Budin Province. Administrative center of the Sanjak of Syrmia was from 1542 Uyluk (Croatian: Ilok) and in the second half of the 17th century it was Dimitrofça (Serbian: Dmitrovica, today Sremska Mitrovica). Most of the sanjak was ceded to Austria according to Treaty of Karlovitz in 1699. Remainder of the territory of sanjak was transferred to Sanjak of Semendire and was later also ceded to Austria according to Treaty of Passarowitz in 1718.

Administrative divisions

In 1583-87, Sanjak was divided into several nahijas:
Dimitrofça (Dmitrovica)
Ilok
Grgurevci
Irig
Podgajica (Podgorica)
Varadin
Syrmia
Morović

In 1667, Sanjak was divided into several kadiluks:
Dimitrofça (Dmitrovica)
Ilok
Budim
Irig
Nijemci
Rača
Vukovar
Grgurevci
Slankamen

Population

Sanjak was mostly populated by Orthodox Serbs and Muslims of various ethnic origins. Population of villages was entirely Serb, while population of towns and cities was ethnically and religiously diverse. The largest city in sanjak was Dimitrofça (Dmitrovica), which, according to 1545-48 data was mainly populated by Serbs and according to 1566-69 data mainly by Muslims.

See also
 Subdivisions of the Ottoman Empire
 Syrmia
 Ottoman monuments of Ilok
 Turkish Springs in Stari Ledinci
 Gallipoli Serbs

References
Dr. Dušan J. Popović, Srbi u Vojvodini, knjiga 1, Novi Sad, 1990.
Istorijski atlas, Geokarta, Beograd, 1999.
 N. Moačanin, Slavonija i Srijem u razdoblju osmanske vladavine, 2001.
Željko Holjevac, Nenad Moačanin: Hrvatsko-slavonska Vojna krajina i Hrvati pod vlašću Osmanskoga carstva u ranome novom vijeku,2007.

External links
 Seher Mitrovica - Mitrovica under the Turkish rule

Ottoman history of Vojvodina
Sanjak of Syrmia
Sanjaks of the Ottoman Empire in Europe
States and territories established in 1541
Ottoman Serbia
Ottoman period in the history of Croatia
1541 establishments in the Ottoman Empire
1699 disestablishments in the Ottoman Empire